This article show all participating team squads at the 2014 FIVB World Grand Prix, played by twelve countries with the final round held in

Head Coach:
The following is the Algeria roster in the 2014 FIVB World Grand Prix.

Head Coach:
The following is the Argentina roster in the 2014 FIVB World Grand Prix.

Head Coach:
The following is the Australia roster in the 2014 FIVB World Grand Prix.

Head Coach:
The following is the Belgium roster in the 2014 FIVB World Grand Prix.

Head Coach:
The following is the Brazil roster in the 2014 FIVB World Grand Prix.

Head Coach:
The following is the Bulgaria roster in the 2014 FIVB World Grand Prix.

Head Coach:
The following is the Canada roster in the 2014 FIVB World Grand Prix.

The following is the China roster in the 2014 FIVB World Grand Prix.

Head Coach:
The following is the Croatia roster in the 2014 FIVB World Grand Prix.

Head Coach:
The following is the Czech Republic roster in the 2014 FIVB World Grand Prix.

Head Coach:
The following is the Cuba roster in the 2014 FIVB World Grand Prix.

Head Coach:  Marcos Kwiek

The following is the Dominican Republic roster in the 2014 FIVB World Grand Prix.

Head Coach:

The following is the Germany roster in the 2014 FIVB World Grand Prix.

Head Coach:
The following is the Italy roster in the 2014 FIVB World Grand Prix.

Head Coach: Masayoshi Manabe

Head Coach:
The following is the Kazakhstan roster in the 2014 FIVB World Grand Prix.

Head Coach:
The following is the Kenya roster in the 2014 FIVB World Grand Prix.

Head coach:
The following is the South Korea roster in the 2014 FIVB World Grand Prix.

Head Coach:
The following is the Mexico roster in the 2014 FIVB World Grand Prix.

Head Coach:
The following is the Netherlands roster in the 2014 FIVB World Grand Prix.

Head Coach: Natalia Málaga

Head Coach: Piotr Makowski
The following is the Poland roster in the 2014 FIVB World Grand Prix.

Head Coach:
The following is the Puerto Rico roster in the 2014 FIVB World Grand Prix.

Head Coach:
The following is the Russia roster in the 2014 FIVB World Grand Prix.

Head Coach:  Zoran Terzić 
The following is the Serbia roster in the 2014 FIVB World Grand Prix.

Head Coach:  Kiattipong Radchatagriengkai
The following is the Thailand roster in the 2014 FIVB World Grand Prix.

Head Coach:  Massimo Barbolini

Head Coach:  Karch Kiraly
The following is the United States roster in the 2014 FIVB World Grand Prix.

References

External links
FIVB

2014
2014 in volleyball